The Shuswap Nation Tribal Council is a First Nations Tribal Council in the Canadian province of British Columbia.  Based in the Thompson and Shuswap Districts of the Central Interior, although including one band on the upper Columbia River in the East Kootenay region. It is one of two tribal councils of the Secwepemc people, the other being the Northern Shuswap Tribal Council of the Cariboo region farther to the north. The council is based in Kamloops, British Columbia.

Member governments

Adams Lake Indian Band (Sexqeltqin)
Kamloops Indian Band (T'Kemlups)
Shuswap Indian Band (Kenpesq't, at Invermere)
Little Shuswap Indian Band (Skwlax, at Chase)
Neskonlith Indian Band, (Sk'etsin at Salmon Arm and Chase)
Skeetchestn Indian Band, (at Savona)
Spallumcheen Indian Band, (Splatsin at Enderby)
Bonaparte Indian Band (St'uxwtews, near Cache Creek)
Whispering Pines/Clinton Indian Band (Pelltiq't, at Clinton)
North Thompson Indian Band (Simpcw, at Barriere)

Three Secwepemc bands do not belong to either the Shuswap Nation Tribal Council or the Northern Shuswap Tribal Council, these being the Alkali Lake Indian Band (Esketemc), the High Bar First Nation (Llenlleney'ten) and the Pavilion Indian Band (Tsk'weylecw).  The Pavilion Band are also members of the Lillooet Tribal Council.

See also

Northern Shuswap Tribal Council
Secwepemc
Shuswap language (Secwepemcstin)
Gustafsen Lake Standoff
List of tribal councils in British Columbia

External links
Shuswap Nation homepage

Secwepemc
First Nations tribal councils in British Columbia
Thompson Country
Kamloops